Endobasidium is a genus of fungi in the Exobasidiaceae family. The genus is monotypic and contains the single species Endobasidium clandestinum, found in Samarkand and named by Nikolay Nikolayevich Speshnev in 1901.

References

External links
 

Ustilaginomycotina
Monotypic Basidiomycota genera